Wurman is a Jewish surname of Germanic origin.

List of persons with the surname 
 Alex Wurman (born 1966), American composer
 Felix Wurman (1958-2009), American cellist and composer
 Richard Saul Wurman (born 1935), American architect and graphic designer, co-founder of TED Conferences (father of Josh Wurman)
 Joshua Wurman (born 1960), American atmospheric scientist and inventor (son of Richard Saul Wurman)

Jewish surnames
German-language surnames